John Paul "Johnny" Herbert (born 25 June 1964) is a British former racing driver and former television announcer for Sky Sports F1. He raced in Formula One from 1989 to 2000, for seven different teams, winning three races and placing 4th in the 1995 World Drivers' Championship. He also raced sports cars, winning the Le Mans 24 Hours in 1991 driving a Mazda 787B.

Career

Early career and entry to Formula One

Winning the Formula Ford Festival at Brands Hatch in 1985, Herbert caught Eddie Jordan's attention, and together they won the 1987 British Formula 3 title. Herbert suffered career-threatening injuries in 1988, as a then championship hopeful in International Formula 3000 when he was caught up in a major accident at Brands Hatch, when Gregor Foitek nudged the side of his vehicle at Pilgrim's Drop, causing Herbert to slam into the wall head-on, then bounce across the track and slam head on again into the opposite barrier, sustaining severe ankle and foot injuries after yet more multiple collisions with the barriers. The threat of amputation loomed but it eventually passed after multiple surgeries and months of physiotherapy, though the extent of Herbert's injuries would permanently hinder his mobility, leaving him unable to run and forcing him to change his driving style.

Despite his immobility, Herbert returned to racing at the beginning of 1989 in Formula 1, scoring points on his debut at the Brazilian Grand Prix in Rio de Janeiro driving for the Benetton team, then managed by his long-time mentor and friend Peter Collins. Herbert finished 4th in Brazil, only 10.5 seconds behind the race winning Ferrari of Nigel Mansell and only 1.1 seconds behind the 3rd placed March-Judd of Maurício Gugelmin and only 2.6 seconds behind the 2nd placed McLaren-Honda of then double World Champion Alain Prost. Herbert's teammate, the highly rated Italian Alessandro Nannini, finished in 6th place, 7.7 seconds behind Herbert.

However, Herbert's performances could not keep up to that standard (he reportedly found it hard to press the brake pedal, which adversely affected his lap times), and with the Benetton team under new management he was dropped after failing to qualify for the Canadian Grand Prix (after having finished 5th in the previous round in Phoenix) and was replaced by McLaren's test driver Emanuele Pirro. Herbert returned to Formula 3000, this time in the highly regarded Japanese series. It was not long before he received another call from Formula One, this time with Tyrrell. From 1990 to 2000, Herbert was a fixture in Formula One, switching to the dwindling Lotus team, now managed by Peter Collins. His first race for the Norfolk-based team came at the 1990 Japanese Grand Prix after Martin Donnelly suffered a career-ending crash in Jerez. 

In 1991, he returned to the team at the Canadian Grand Prix following the departure of Julian Bailey. He had to relinquish his seat to Michael Bartels while Grands Prix clashed with Japanese F3000 meetings. His first points finish in almost three years came at the 1992 South African Grand Prix when he drove his two-year old Lotus chassis to sixth place. He repeated this result at in France, by this time Lotus had introduced the more competitive 107. Poor reliabilty and bad luck cost him the chance to add to his points tally but Herbert showed well against his highly rated team mate, future-World Champion Mika Häkkinen. In the 24 races the two drove alongside each other at Lotus, Herbert outqualified the Finn 14 times. 1993 was his most successful season with Lotus, finishing in fourth place three times. But 1994 was a disaster as the team was blighted by financial woes. He utilised an upgraded Mugen Honda introduced for the Italian Grand Prix to qualify a magnificent fourth but hopes of a strong finish were quashed when he was involved in a multi-car collision at the first corner. Lotus' lack of resources meant he had to use the spare car with the old-spec Mugen engine, which didn't last long before it expired. His final race for Lotus came at the Portuguese Grand Prix.

During 1991, he also drove two rounds of the Fuji Long Distance Sports Car Series, co-driving a Mazda 787B, finishing fourth both times. His decision at the July round to stop his car and aid a fellow competitor who had suffered a puncture at high speed would earn him the Sportsman Award at the 1991 Autosport Awards.

Ligier and return to Benetton (1994–1995)

After three years of frustration, Herbert had his Lotus contract bought out by Tom Walkinshaw in late 1994, joining Ligier and then Benetton for the last few races of the season. Although he failed to score any points in 1994, he was retained as Michael Schumacher's teammate for 1995. As Benetton's number-two driver he found life at the team difficult with the B195 specifically designed around Schumacher's driving style. The World Champion also forbade Herbert from viewing his telemetry. He achieved his first podium finish with a second place in Spain as Benetton scored their first one-two finish since 1990. He then took his first victory at the British Grand Prix after Damon Hill and Michael Schumacher collided. Prior to the race rumours were abound that he was about to be dropped in favour of test-driver Jos Verstappen. He followed this in similar circumstances at Monza and finished 4th in the championship.

Sauber, Stewart and Jaguar (1996–2000)

After being dropped by Benetton, Herbert drove for Swiss team Sauber in 1996–1998, scoring two podium places, the first of the two being in the 1996 Monaco Grand Prix, which were his only points of that season, and the other being in the 1997 Hungarian Grand Prix. That year would be the only of his three seasons at Sauber where Herbert would score several times because he also finished 4th twice (Argentina and Belgium), 5th on two further occasions (Spain and Canada) as well as 6th in Japan. Moving to Stewart Grand Prix in 1999, he was routinely outqualified by his younger teammate Rubens Barrichello but scored his third and final Grand Prix win in the rain-affected European Grand Prix. At the Malaysian Grand Prix he finished fourth in a race which he would later describe as his strongest performance since his pre-accident days. Staying at Stewart after the team was purchased by Ford and became Jaguar, Herbert endured another frustrating and pointless season, ending the year being stretchered off at Malaysia after a suspension failure caused him to crash heavily.

After Formula One

In 2001 he was employed by Arrows F1 team owner Tom Walkinshaw, to act as the team developmental/test driver.

Since retiring from Formula One racing, Herbert has concentrated on sports car racing, trying to repeat his Le Mans 24 Hours overall win of 1991. Recent years have seen him as one of the front runners in the American Le Mans Series (ALMS), where he won several events and was a challenger for the 2003 crown.

In 2004, Herbert, along with Jamie Davies won the Le Mans Series championship at the wheel of an Audi R8 winning the races at Monza and Spa along the way.

In 2005, Herbert was appointed to the post of Sporting Relations Manager at Jordan Grand Prix, which was then renamed Midland F1 for the 2006 World Championship. However, in September of that year Spyker Cars bought the team, and renamed it Spyker MF1. One of the new owners' decisions was to not renew Herbert's contract.

In 2007, Herbert entered the Le Mans 24 Hours driving for the factory Aston Martin team at the wheel of the Aston Martin DBR9 in the GT1 class. Herbert, along with Peter Kox and Tomáš Enge drove the 007 numbered car to a 9th placed overall finish and 4th in the GT1 class.

In 2008, Herbert won the first season of the Speedcar Series.

In 2009, Herbert made his debut in the British Touring Car Championship for Team Dynamics at the wheel of a Honda Civic at round eight of the championship, Silverstone. He qualified 17th for the first race, and after moving up the order, finished in 13th. In the second race, he finished inside the points in eighth place, scoring three points. In the final race of the day, a reverse starting grid is operated. The first six, seven, eight, nine or ten cars to finish race two, start race three in reverse order. This is decided by the winner of race two drawing a number between six and ten out of a hat. For the final race of the day, the top 9 finishers were reversed, meaning Herbert started from second. He was running well, and was holding 4th, but was forced to retire on lap 13, after contact with Jason Plato. Herbert went on to compete in the final two rounds of the season.

Herbert also runs a charity event called the Johnny Herbert Karting Challenge every year for charities like the halow project which is now held at Capital Karts in London. This event invites celebrities and professional racing drivers to compete in indoor go karting and is now in its 20th year.

Sky Sports F1

From 2012 to 2022, Herbert was a regular contributor to the Sky Sports F1 channel. He was an occasional presence as one of the insiders in "Sky Race Control" during practices, qualifying sessions, and races alongside Anthony Davidson, Damon Hill, Nico Rosberg, and Paul Di Resta. 

On 25 January 2023, Sky Sports F1 announced Herbert will not return to the team for the 2023 season.

GT Academy
In 2013 and 2014, Herbert mentored six contestants in a primetime ITV4 reality series, with the aim of taking players of the Gran Turismo videogames to the Dubai 24 Hour race as real drivers. Other countries in Europe had heats mentored by drivers Vitantonio Liuzzi and Sébastien Buemi.

Racing record

Career summary

† As Herbert was a guest driver, he was ineligible for championship points.

Complete International Formula 3000 results
(key) (Races in bold indicate pole position) (Races 
in italics indicate fastest lap)

Complete Formula One results
(key) (Races in bold indicate pole position)

 Driver did not finish the Grand Prix, but was classified as he completed over 90% of the race distance.

Complete Japanese Formula 3000 Championship results
(key) (Races in bold indicate pole position) (Races in italics indicate fastest lap)

24 Hours of Le Mans results

Complete American Le Mans Series results

Complete IndyCar Series results
(key) (Races in bold indicate pole position)

Indianapolis 500 results

Complete British Touring Car Championship results
(key) (Races in bold indicate pole position – 1 point awarded just in first race) (Races in italics indicate fastest lap – 1 point awarded all races) (* signifies that driver lead race for at least one lap – 1 point awarded all races)

Complete International Superstars Series results
(key) (Races in bold indicate pole position) (Races in italics indicate fastest lap)

Helmet
Herbert's helmet design was red with white line going from the rear going through the sides and on the mouthplate, black stripes on the lower sides a black stripe on the rear (in a similar fashion to Depailler's helmet), in 1999, when he drove for Stewart, the stripes on the lower sides were changed to green and on the top of the helmet was added a drop with the union jack. In 2000, when he drove for Jaguar, the green areas became blue.

References

Further reading

External links

 Herbert's website
 Johnny Herbert statistics

1964 births
Living people
People from Romford
English racing drivers
English Formula One drivers
Benetton Formula One drivers
Tyrrell Formula One drivers
Team Lotus Formula One drivers
Ligier Formula One drivers
Sauber Formula One drivers
Stewart Formula One drivers
Jaguar Formula One drivers
Formula One race winners
International Formula 3000 drivers
Japanese Formula 3000 Championship drivers
British Formula Three Championship drivers
Formula Ford drivers
Grand Prix Masters drivers
24 Hours of Le Mans drivers
24 Hours of Le Mans winning drivers
American Le Mans Series drivers
Deutsche Tourenwagen Masters drivers
British Touring Car Championship drivers
Speedcar Series drivers
European Le Mans Series drivers
World Sportscar Championship drivers
Superstars Series drivers
Blancpain Endurance Series drivers
24 Hours of Spa drivers
Sportspeople from Essex
12 Hours of Sebring drivers
Aston Martin Racing drivers
AF Corse drivers
United Autosports drivers
Oreca drivers
Audi Sport drivers
Team Joest drivers
Team LeMans drivers
Nürburgring 24 Hours drivers
Volkswagen Motorsport drivers